Zhao Pengda (born in 1931) is a Chinese mathematical geologist. He was a professor at the China University of Geosciences (Wuhan). He was the first Asian to receive the William Christian Krumbein Medal in 1990 from International Association for Mathematical Geosciences. He is considered as the Father of Mathematical Geology in China. He is an academician of the Chinese Academy of Sciences.

Education
1958 Graduate, Moscow Geological Surveys College Russia, Moscow (Received Associate Doctorate)   
1952 Graduate, Beijing University, Geology Department Beijing Municipality

Career
Commissioner, State Academic Degrees Committee   
Professor, China University of Geosciences (Wuhan)   
President, China University of Geosciences (Wuhan)
1995 — Foreign Academician, Russian Academy of Natural Sciences
1995 Academician, (International University Science Institute)   
1993 — Academician, Chinese Academy of Sciences

Awards and honors
William Christian Krumbein Medal (1990)
Academician of the Chinese Academy of Sciences

References

1931 births
Living people
Academic staff of China University of Geosciences
20th-century Chinese geologists
Educators from Liaoning
Mathematicians from Liaoning
Members of the Chinese Academy of Sciences
Peking University alumni
People from Fushun